EPH receptor A1 (ephrin type-A receptor 1) is a protein that in humans is encoded by the EPHA1 gene.

This gene belongs to the ephrin receptor subfamily of the protein-tyrosine kinase family. EPH and EPH-related receptors have been implicated in mediating developmental events, particularly in the nervous system. Receptors in the EPH subfamily typically have a single kinase domain and an extracellular region containing a Cys-rich domain and 2 fibronectin type III repeats. The ephrin receptors are divided into 2 groups based on the similarity of their extracellular domain sequences and their affinities for binding ephrin-A and ephrin-B ligands. This gene is expressed in some human cancer cell lines and has been implicated in carcinogenesis.

References

Further reading

Tyrosine kinase receptors